The 29th International Emmy Awards took place on November 19, 2001 in New York City and hosted by American television personality Tom Bergeron. The award ceremony, presented by the International Academy of Television Arts and Sciences (IATAS), honors all programming produced and originally aired outside the United States.

Ceremony 
The nominees for the 29th International Emmy Awards were announced by International Academy of Television Arts and Sciences, on October 8, 2001, at a press conference at MIPCOM in Cannes. United Kingdom won four of the six categories that competed at the International Emmys. The Channel 4 took the Emmy award in the popular arts category for his So Graham Norton series. ITV's Dirty Tricks, starring Martin Clunes, won best drama, while the arts documentary award went to Channel 4's The Miles Davis Story.

A filmed version of the Andrew Lloyd Webber musical, Jesus Christ Superstar, whose cast featured Rik Mayall, was the winner in the performing arts section. The other two trophies — children and young people, and documentary — went to Canada for CBC’s Street Cents and the Netherlands for KRO’s North Korea, respectively.

Winners

References

External links 
 
 
 Int’l Emmy noms unveiled

International Emmy Awards ceremonies
International
International